Chakra: The Invincible is an Indian animated superhero film based on the main character created by Stan Lee, with Sharad Devarajan and Gotham Chopra. It aired in English and Hindi. The movie is produced by Graphic India and POW! Entertainment, and was premiered on Cartoon Network on 30 November 2013.

Plot
The movie features Raju Rai, a young Indian boy living in Mumbai, India. Raju's mentor, the scientist Dr. Singh, develops a technological suit that weaponizes all the Chakras in the body. Raju uses his powers to be a superhero and vows to use the suit to protect and serve Mumbai as he battles super-villains.

Merchandising
Stan Lee, in association with Graphic India and POW! Entertainment, released comic books, games and toys based on the superhero Chakra.

Sequels
Two sequels, entitled Chakra: The Rise of Infinitus and Chakra: The Revenge of Magnus Flux, aired on Toonami on 25 September 2016 and 15 February 2017 respectively.

References

External links
 Chakra: The Invincible's Graphic India page
 

Indian animated films
2013 television films
2013 films
2010s animated superhero television films
2010s Indian superhero films
Cartoon Network (Indian TV channel)
Indian television films
Cartoon Network television films
Toonami
Indian animated speculative fiction films
Indian superhero films